Prakash Gurung is musician and singer of Nepalese music. He got inspired by his friends in his early childhood to enter into creating music. He was born and raised in Darjeeling, the place where he got chance to learn music from prominent musician of the time such as Amber Gurung, Gopal Yonzon, Karma Yonzon, and Nati Kazi. In addition, he used to assist Narayan Gopal while performing in Darjeeling.

References

21st-century Nepalese male singers
Living people
Year of birth missing (living people)
Nepali-language singers from India
People from Darjeeling
Gurung people